Himetric is a resolution-independent unit of length. Its role is similar to the twip, but it is one hundredth of a millimetre. It is mainly used in Object Linking and Embedding and derived technologies such as ActiveX, Active Template Library and Visual Basic up to version 6.

References

Typography
Units of length
Computer graphics
Non-SI metric units